The Dalou Mountains (} are a range of limestone mountains running  north east to south west across the Yunnan-Guizhou Plateau spanning Guizhou and Sichuan Provinces, People's Republic of China. At , Mount Jinfo (金佛山) in Nanchuan District, Chongqing is the highest peak in a range that is also the watershed between the Wu and Chishui rivers.

References

Mountain ranges of Sichuan